Shams Central College is a public school located in Maruthamunai, Eastern Province, Sri Lanka. The school provides both primary and secondary education from Grade 6 to Advanced Level, all streams including Arts, Commerce, Bio, Maths and Technical Streams.

History 

The school started in 1959 as Karavahu East Government Muslim Mixed School with a Coconut Leafy cadjan hut classrooms with 114 students (Girls:49 and Boys 65) and 7 teachers. The first principal of the school was Marhoom Al Haj IMA. Kuthoos.

See also 
 Education in Sri Lanka
 List of schools in Sri Lanka
 List of schools in Eastern Province, Sri Lanka

References

Provincial schools in Sri Lanka
Schools in Ampara District
Maruthamunai